Testa Ridge is a ridge named after J. Ward Testa, biologist, University of Minnesota (later University of Alaska), who conducted seal studies during eight field seasons in McMurdo Sound and other coastal regions, 1980–92.

Ridges of Victoria Land
Scott Coast